Sebastián Ariel Romero (born 27 April 1978, in La Plata), nicknamed Chirola, is an Argentine football coach and former player who played as a winger. He is the current manager of Gimnasia La Plata.

Playing career
While playing for Gimnasia y Esgrima (LP), Romero came to prominence as a key member of Argentina Under-20's victorious 1997 FIFA World Youth Championship team in Malaysia. He has played for clubs in Argentina, Spain, France, and Greece. After 3 seasons at Club de Gimnasia y Esgrima La Plata, he moved to Europe to play for Real Betis, Toulouse FC, and Córdoba CF.

In 2002, Romero transferred back to Argentina for 1.5 million dollars to play for Racing Club, and played 4 seasons for Racing before leaving Argentina again, this time to play for Panathinaikos. In Panathinaikos, he played for two seasons. Then, in 2008, he came back to Gimnasia to help in its fight against relegation. He had a very good season in 2008-2009, but his 2009-2010 season was mediocre, falling out of favor with Diego Cocca, the then coach of Gimnasia. In both seasons, Gimnasia was able to stay in Argentina's top league.

Romero joined Banfield for the 2010-11 Argentine Primera División season. Then, in July 2011, he joined Quilmes, then in Argentina's second division. Quilmes won promotion to the top league at the end of the 2011-2012 season.

At the end of 2019, Chirola left Quilmes, having scored 13 goals in 153 matches since joining the club in 2011.

He has one cap with the national team of Argentina.

References

External links

Guardian statistics
  Argentine Primera statistics

1978 births
Living people
People from Berisso
Argentine footballers
Association football midfielders
Argentina under-20 international footballers
Argentina youth international footballers
Club de Gimnasia y Esgrima La Plata footballers
Real Betis players
Córdoba CF players
Toulouse FC players
Racing Club de Avellaneda footballers
Panathinaikos F.C. players
Club Atlético Banfield footballers
Argentina international footballers
Argentine expatriate footballers
Expatriate footballers in France
Expatriate footballers in Greece
Expatriate footballers in Spain
Argentine expatriate sportspeople in France
Argentine expatriate sportspeople in Greece
Argentine expatriate sportspeople in Spain
Argentine Primera División players
Ligue 1 players
La Liga players
Segunda División players
Super League Greece players
Quilmes Atlético Club footballers
Sportspeople from Buenos Aires Province
Argentine football managers
Club de Gimnasia y Esgrima La Plata managers